Les Boubou Macoutes was the popular nickname of special inspectors who investigated and visited the homes of suspected "welfare cheats" in the Canadian province of Quebec during the second government of Premier Robert Bourassa, in the 1990s.

The phrase derives from a combination of Boubou, the popular nickname of Robert Bourassa, and the Tonton Macoutes – the secret police of Haiti under Papa Doc (François Duvalier) and Baby Doc (Jean-Claude Duvalier).

See also
Nicknames of politicians and personalities in Quebec
Robert Bourassa
Politics of Quebec

Political history of Quebec
Government of Quebec
Welfare in Canada
Welfare fraud